Gmina Leśniowice is a rural gmina (administrative district) in Chełm County, Lublin Voivodeship, in eastern Poland.

Villages
Gmina Leśniowice contains the villages and settlements of Alojzów, Dębina, Horodysko, Janówka, Kasiłan, Kumów Majoracki, Kumów Plebański, Leśniowice, Leśniowice-Kolonia, Majdan Leśniowski, Nowy Folwark, Plisków, Plisków-Kolonia, Politówka, Poniatówka, Rakołupy, Rakołupy Duże, Rakołupy Małe, Sarniak, Sielec, Teresin, Wierzbica and Wygnańce.

Neighbouring gminas
Gmina Leśniowice is bordered by the gminas of Chełm, Kamień, Kraśniczyn, Siennica Różana, Wojsławice and Żmudź.

References
Polish official population figures 2006

Lesniowice
Chełm County